Olive Hill may refer to:
Populated Places
 Olive Hill, California
 Olive Hill, Kentucky
 Olivehill, Tennessee
Olive Hill, Virginia (listed on the NRHP in Virginia)

Summit
 Olive Hill (California)